Eupolymnia is a genus of annelids belonging to the family Terebellidae.

The genus has almost cosmopolitan distribution.

Species:

Eupolymnia boniniana 
Eupolymnia capensis 
Eupolymnia caulleryi 
Eupolymnia chlorobranchiata 
Eupolymnia congruens 
Eupolymnia corae 
Eupolymnia crassicornis 
Eupolymnia dubia 
Eupolymnia heterobranchia 
Eupolymnia intoshi 
Eupolymnia joaoi 
Eupolymnia koorangia 
Eupolymnia labiata 
Eupolymnia magnifica 
Eupolymnia marenzelleri 
Eupolymnia nebulosa 
Eupolymnia nesidensis 
Eupolymnia regnans 
Eupolymnia robusta 
Eupolymnia rullieri 
Eupolymnia trigonostoma 
Eupolymnia triloba 
Eupolymnia umbonis

References

Annelids